Biscuit Run State Park is a planned state park located in Albemarle County, Virginia. The park property was originally planned for a large residential development. In January 2010, as real estate values reeled from the burst housing bubble and ensuing recession, the state negotiated the purchase of the property from developer Forest Lodge, LLC for $21.48 million in cash and tax credits.

A master plan for the development of the park was approved in 2013. It consisted of three phases:

Phase 1: Provides for the construction of trails, playgrounds and park buildings. Cost: $15.5 million. 
Phase 2: Additions include campgrounds and trailheads for bicycle and hiking trails. Cost $13.4 million
Phase 3: Includes rental cabins, road connections across the parks and equestrian trails and parking facilities. Cost: $13.6 million

In January 2018, Terry McAuliffe announced a 99-year lease of the property to Albemarle County.

References

Parks in Albemarle County, Virginia
Protected areas established in 2009
2009 establishments in Virginia